Jakub Klášterka (born 28 April 1994 in Plzeň) is a Czech racing driver. He has previously competed in the GP3 Series.

Racing record

Career summary

Complete GP3 Series results
(key) (Races in bold indicate pole position) (Races in italics indicate fastest lap)

References

External links
 Profile at Driver Database

Czech racing drivers
1994 births
Living people
GP3 Series drivers
People convicted of fraud
Sportspeople from Plzeň

Formula Renault 2.0 NEC drivers
Auto Sport Academy drivers
Jenzer Motorsport drivers